Nicht von dieser Welt 2 ("Not from This World 2") is the sixth studio album by German singer Xavier Naidoo, released via his Naidoo Records label on 1 April 2016 in German-speaking Europe. Titled as the sequel and serving as a  thematical extension to his 1998 breakthrough album Nicht von dieser Welt, it marked Naidoo's reunion with long-time contributor and former mentor Moses Pelham, who wrote and executive produced most of the album with his songwriting collective.

Upon its release, Nicht von dieser Welt 2 debuted atop the album charts in Austria, Germany, and Switzerland, becoming Naidoo's second album to do so following 2005's Telegramm für X. However, though it has since been certified gold by the Bundesverband Musikindustrie (BVMI), indicating sales in excess of 100,000 copies, the album ranks among his lowest-selling albums. Nicht von dieser Welt 2 produced several regular and promotional singles of which leading single "Frei" became the only one to chart, reaching number 64 on the German Singles Chart.

Track listing

Charts

Weekly charts

Year-end charts

Certifications

Release history

References

External links
 

2016 albums
Xavier Naidoo albums